Nialle Seyi E. Rodney (born 28 February 1991) is an English footballer who plays as a forward. He retired in 2014 to pursue a career in business, but resumed playing at amateur level shortly thereafter. He is currently playing at Runcorn Linnets.

Club career

Nottingham Forest
Rodney started his career with Nottingham Forest. In the 2009–10 season, he went out on loan to Ilkeston Town making nine appearances and scoring twice against Eastwood Town and Solihull Moors. He made his Forest debut in November 2010, against Cardiff City, coming on as a substitute for the injured Dexter Blackstock. On 8 March 2011, he signed a one-month loan deal with Football League Two side Burton Albion, but after three appearances he had to return to Nottingham Forest because of an ankle injury.

Bradford City
Rodney left Forest and signed a one-year contract with Bradford City in July 2011. In October 2011, he was given a one-month loan spell at Conference side Darlington to gain first-team experience, before moving to Mansfield Town on loan in November 2011.

Lincoln City
On 31 January 2012 Rodney signed for Conference National club Lincoln City, until the end of the season.

AFC Telford United 
He joined AFC Telford United on 19 February 2013 and on that same day he made his debut for the Bucks in a 3–3 draw at home against Tamworth. He left after the Mansfield game.

Hartlepool United
Rodney joined EFL League Two side Hartlepool United on a one-year contract after impressing coaching staff during a month's trial after scoring in friendlies against Whitby Town and during the club's pre-season tour of Holland against Almere City. Towards the end of March, Hartlepool announced that Rodney was to leave the club at the end of the month.

Non-league
After Rodney's release from Hartlepool, he signed for Ilkeston in October 2014, making four substitute appearances for the club in all competitions. He then played in the Grantham and District Saturday League for Greyhounders.

He then played for Spalding United, Coalville Town, Long Eaton United, Wythenshawe Amateurs and Ramsbottom United.

In May 2019 he signed for FC United of Manchester.

He left FC United in October 2019 and was training with Curzon Ashton before he signed for Lancaster City in November 2019. He made his debut for the club on 16 November in a league match against Scarborough.

In January 2020 he departed Lancaster, signing for Ashton United.

He then rejoined Ramsbottom United. In June 2022 he signed for Runcorn Linnets.

Career statistics

References

External links

Living people
Footballers from Nottingham
English footballers
Nottingham Forest F.C. players
Ilkeston Town F.C. (1945) players
Burton Albion F.C. players
Bradford City A.F.C. players
Darlington F.C. players
Mansfield Town F.C. players
Lincoln City F.C. players
AFC Telford United players
Hartlepool United F.C. players
Ilkeston F.C. players
English Football League players
Association football forwards
1991 births
Black British sportspeople
Spalding United F.C. players
Coalville Town F.C. players
Long Eaton United F.C. players
Ramsbottom United F.C. players
F.C. United of Manchester players
Wythenshawe Amateurs F.C. players
Lancaster City F.C. players
Ashton United F.C. players
Runcorn Linnets F.C. players